Burrendong Dam is a rock-fill embankment major gated dam with a clay core across the Macquarie River upstream of Wellington in the central west region of New South Wales, Australia. The dam's purpose includes flood mitigation, irrigation, water supply and hydro-electric power generation. The dam impounds Lake Burrendong and is filled by the waters from the Macquarie, and Cudgegong rivers as well as Meroo Creek.

History 
The idea of building the dam arose in 1909. However, it was not until 1946 until legislation was passed to construct the dam. Construction commenced in 1950. The town of Mumbil expanded to accommodate the workers building the dam. The dam was completed in April 1965 and water began to flow into it for the first time. It was officially opened on 18 August 1967 by Robert Askin, the Premier of New South Wales. The date was chosen because it was the sesquicentenary of the town of Wellington. In September 1969 the dam was nearly full for the first time.

The village of Burrendong, once a gold-mining area, was flooded by the construction of the dam.

Location and features
The dam was built by the New South Wales Water Conservation & Irrigation Commission for the purposes of providing flood mitigation, irrigation, and water supply.

Burrendong Dam has three times been recorded at a critically low level of 1.5% in drought. Contrastingly, however, Burrendong has mitigated potentially devastating floods downstream by using its flood capacity and releasing water in accordance with downstream tributary flows, safely reaching 160% of capacity in 1990 and 152.8% in 2010. In January 2020, the lake was again reported to be at 1.6% level.

The 32 million first phase of a major upgrade began in 2010 and is expected to be completed during 2015.

Power generation
The station was completed in August 1996 and was officially opened on 9 February 1999 by the Premier of New South Wales, Bob Carr. At the time, the facility was operated by Power Facilities Pty Limited; and is now managed by AGL Energy.

See also

 List of dams and reservoirs in New South Wales

References

External links
 
 
 
 Central West Catchment Management Authority website

Dams completed in 1967
Central West (New South Wales)
Hydroelectric power stations in New South Wales
Dams in the Murray River basin
Dams in New South Wales